Nightlife in Ponce, Puerto Rico includes government and regulatory aspects, societal and cultural attitudes, and age- and gender-centric issues relative to adult and family life after dark in the city of Ponce. It focuses on all entertainment that is available and generally more popular from the late evening into the early hours of the morning. It includes activities like parties, bands and live music, concerts, and stand-up comedies, and venues such as pubs, bars, cabarets, nightclubs, cinemas and theaters. These venues and activities are often accompanied by the serving and drinking of alcoholic beverages in addition to non-alcoholic drinks for the family. Nightlife venues often require a cover charge for admission. 

Ponce is better known for its cultural, artistic and educational heritage and attributes than for its commerce and heavy industry. As such, Ponce's nightlife also offers many venues and events oriented towards families and children in addition to adult-only and the night owl entertainment. Its two major areas of nightlife activity are the historic downtown zone and the sea-front La Guancha complex.

Social and regulatory aspects 
 

Adult nightlife establishments in Ponce, like pubs, bars and nightclubs, function as third places. Vibrant Ponce nightlife scenes contribute to the development of a local culture. Some nightlife establishments in the city require adherence to a dress code. Though mostly true of nightclubs, one notable case is Proscenium, a cafe theater in Barrio Tercero, at the corner of Calle Marina and Calle Isabel, across from Plaza Muñoz Rivera in the downtown district. 

Until 17 October 2005, there was no national or municipality-mandated last call for purchase of alcoholic beverages in the city of Ponce. There were also no mandated hours of operation for liquor stores. On 17 October, however, Municipal Law #24 went into effect establishing a 3:00AM (Monday through Wednesday) and a 3:30AM (Thursday through Sunday) last calls. Drinking on the street is legal, except in the Downtown historic district and the La Guancha sea-front recreational area. In any event, regardless of the 17 October 2005 ordinance, sales are prohibited on Election Day and during hurricane emergencies. Beer, wine and spirits are available for sale at Ponce supermarkets, convenience stores and drug stores as well as liquor stores. The minimum age for purchasing alcohol is 18 years; this is also the minimum drinking age. Nightlife venues must be licensed to serve alcohol.

Prostitution was legalized in Ponce in 1894 and was permitted until the late 1910s. In 1894, Mayor Nouvilas de Vilar issued an anti-prostitution edict, the Reglamento de Higiene de la Prostitución (Prostitution Higiene Decree), intended to "correct immorality in Ponce". Prostitutes had to register with the municipal government to operate, and had to pay a hygiene tax. This gave them the right to regular medical exams and access to a personal passbook certifying they had received a clean bill of health. Exercising prostitution without registering was charged as "trafficking in sex" without registration.  In 2012, Enrique Arrarás Mir, the Commissioner of the event, said that “the safest place in all of Puerto Rico during the celebration of Las Justas will be the city of Ponce”. In 2011, in Mayaguez, there were also arrests for drunkness and drug trafficking. In 2014, electronic scanners were implemented at checkpoints, doing away with the former and slower manual frisk system.

Family-oriented events

La Guancha is a venue for socializing, informal outdoor dancing, listening to live bands and even kareoking on the seafront. Concha Acústica de Ponce is an open-air amphitheater that has hosted from the classical music of Banda Municipal de Ponce to the swift rhythms of Ponce Jazz Festival groups. Teatro La Perla is a historic indoors venue known for its live shows as well as its classical music performances and stand-up comedies.

Las Mañanitas is a family oriented event that takes place every year on December 12 in the wee hours of the morning. Fiestas patronales take place during the second week of December at the downtown Plaza Las Delicias. Carnaval Ponceño has evening and late night events with live music during the week of lent, either in February or March.
The Ponce Jazz Festival is another event that has taken place the last few years with live performances at Concha Acústica de Ponce.

 held its seventh event in July 2018 and celebrated its one-year anniversary on 29 November 2019.  The event takes place at Plaza 65 de Infanteria in Barrio Playa on the last Friday of every month.

Gallery

See also

 List of events in Ponce, Puerto Rico
 Porta Caribe

References

Further reading
 Patrick Urbain. Ponce nocturno: 44 dibujos que retratan la vida nocturna de Ponce. 2016.

External links

 
 

Tourist attractions in Ponce, Puerto Rico